Nicholas Russo (1845–1902) was an Italian-American Jesuit priest, philosophy professor, president of Boston College, and founder of Our Lady of Loreto parish in Lower Manhattan.

Early life

Nicholas Russo was born on April 24, 1845, in the Province of Ascoli Piceno in the Marche region of central Italy. His father was a prominent physician who expected his son to follow in his footsteps. Instead, young Nicholas ran away from home in 1862 and went to France to become a Jesuit. He entered the novitiate at the age of 17.

Academic career

In 1875, he was sent to the United States to study theology at Woodstock College. After his ordination in 1877 he was sent to Boston College to teach Logic and Metaphysics. During his time there he published two books on philosophy and religion; he was the first faculty member to publish a book while connected with the college. One of his students was the future cardinal William Henry O'Connell, who wrote in an 1880 letter:

Certainly Father Russo is a stern teacher. He never speaks a word to a soul except as he speaks to all in class. He sits at the rostrum looking like some great medieval scholar — great black eyes, a lean sallow face, and a look which turns you into stone if you don't happen to know your lesson.

In 1887, following the death of college president Thomas H. Stack, SJ, Russo was appointed the seventh president of Boston College. He was succeeded by Robert Fulton, SJ, in July 1888. That year he became procurator at St. Francis Xavier in New York, and was appointed Moderator of the Cases of Conscience for the archdiocese, a post he held in addition to his other duties for the rest of his life. In 1889 he taught philosophy at Georgetown University, and in 1890 published his third book. He then returned to New York, where he served at St. Ignatius Loyola and wrote speeches and papers for Archbishop Michael Corrigan.

Our Lady of Loreto Parish

When Russo arrived in New York, tensions between Italian immigrants and the city's predominantly Irish clergy had been building for some time. Due to language and cultural differences the immigrants' needs were not being met, and local Protestant churches were actively recruiting converts from among their numbers. When Archbishop Corrigan enlisted the aid of the Jesuits in establishing a new parish in Little Italy on the Lower East Side, Russo was selected for the job.

With that, Russo gave up a successful career in academia to serve a community of poor immigrants who, he later wrote, "worked like slaves" to make ends meet. As one biographer noted, "It must have been, humanly speaking, no small sacrifice...for he had held high positions in Boston and New York and his work had lain almost entirely among the better instructed and wealthy." With the help of another Italian Jesuit, Father Aloysius Romano, who was on loan from the Naples province, Russo rented a barroom on Elizabeth Street and converted it into a chapel which could hold about 150 people. They built an altar and two confessionals, cleaned the walls, painted, and hung a sign over the door that read, "Missione Italiana della Madonna di Loreto". The chapel opened on August 16, 1891, the Feast of San Rocco, with Russo delivering the sermon in Italian.

The parish soon outgrew its makeshift chapel, so in 1892 the archdiocese purchased two tenement buildings across the street, and after renovations the new church was dedicated by the archbishop on September 27. Living in the small residence on the upper floor of the church, Fathers Russo and Romano taught catechism classes, established several clubs and sodalities, and helped the neediest parishioners as best they could. Two priests from Sicily, Fathers Longo and Palermo, joined the parish in the early 1890s. In 1895, Russo started a parochial school in the basement of the church. A few months later, the Jesuit Society purchased two adjoining houses and refurbished them for school use. Russo started devotions to the Sacred Heart, which were popular with his parishioners, and led weekly meetings of the St. Aloysius Club for boys, with games, crafts, and dramatics.

Russo died of pneumonia on April 1, 1902, aged 56. By that time, the church was drawing 3,000 worshipers every Sunday and the school had 700 students. After his death, a colleague wrote, "There can be no doubt that he shortened his life by his constant labor for these poor people."

Published works

 Summa Philosophica juxta Scholasticorum Principia, complectens Logicam et Metaphysicam (Boston: Thomas B. Noonan & Co., 1885).
 The True Religion and Its Dogmas (Boston: Thomas B. Noonan & Co., 1886).
 De Philosophia Morale Praelectiones (Neo-Eborace: Benziger Fratres, 1890).

See also
 List of Boston College presidents
 Basilica della Santa Casa

Notes

References

External links

 Church of Our Lady of Loreto, New York City
 A Brief History of the New York Province

19th-century American Jesuits
20th-century American Jesuits
Boston College faculty
Presidents of Boston College
American people of Italian descent
People from le Marche
1845 births
1902 deaths